Mitchell Peninsula is a rocky peninsula,  long and  wide, lying between O'Brien Bay and Sparkes Bay at the east side of the Windmill Islands, Antarctica. It was first mapped from aerial photographs taken by U.S. Navy Operation Highjump in February 1947 and thought to be an island connected by a steep snow ramp to the continental ice overlying Budd Coast, though the term peninsula was considered more appropriate by the Wilkes Station party of 1957.

On its southern side is Bednarz Cove, and Drew Cove indents the west side.

See also
Harrigan Hill

References

Peninsulas of Antarctica
Landforms of Wilkes Land